Lucius Volumnius Flamma Violens was a consul of the Roman Republic, a novus homo ("new man") who was the first consul to come from his plebeian gens. Volumnius served as consul twice, in 307 BC and 296 BC, both times in partnership with the patrician Appius Claudius Caecus. He took an active role in leading Roman forces during the Third Samnite War.

Background
According to Roman tradition, membership of the Roman Senate, the city's magistracies, the offices of consul and various religious positions were restricted to patricians. Volumnius was a beneficiary of the Conflict of the Orders, when, during a 200-year struggle, plebeians gradually gained political equality and the right to hold all such offices. The Lex Licinia Sextia of 367 BC had restored the consulship and sought to reserve one of the two consular offices for a plebeian, but in practice this failed to happen until the first election of Volumnius in 307. The Conflict of the Orders was finally resolved in 287 BC, when plebeians gained political equality.

Career
A new man, Volumnius was the first member of his family to become a consul. John Briscoe says of him "The first plebeian consul known to have presided was L. Volumnius Flamma Violens in 296 ." However, Mario Torelli says "...the famous P  Volumnius Flamma Violens, cos. 307 and 296 BC, could be among the (plebeian) descendants of P. Volumnius Amintinus Gallus, cos. 461."

Volumnius served as consul twice, in 307 BC and 296 BC, both times in partnership with the patrician Appius Claudius Caecus.

The Third Samnite War broke out in 298 BC. By the end of its second campaign, the Samnites, led by Gellius Egnatius, seemed defeated, but the next year Egnatius formed an alliance against Rome with Etruria. This had the effect of withdrawing Roman troops from Samnium, which according to Livy's Ab Urbe condita had been assigned to Volumnius as his sphere of action. In 296, a combined Etruscan and Samnite army invaded Campania, but was defeated by the combined armies of Volumnius and Claudius, in a battle near the River Volturnus.

Wife
Volumnius married Verginia, the daughter of Aulus Verginius, a patrician. She is one of the one hundred and six subjects of Giovanni Boccaccio's On Famous Women (De mulieribus claris, 1362 AD). In about 295 BC, the patrician matronae insulted Verginia by forbidding her access to the ceremony at the shrine of Pudicitia Patricia honouring the female virtue of pudicitia (modesty, or sexual virtue), on account of her having married a plebeian. As a result, she erected an altar in her own house to Plebeia Pudicitia. Boccaccio says: "Beginning at that time, and for long thereafter, the temple of Plebeia Pudicitia was equal in sanctity to the altar of the patricians, since no one could offer a sacrifice in it unless she were of singular chastity and had had only one husband..."

References

Ancient Roman dictators
Ancient Roman generals
Ancient Roman jurists
4th-century BC Roman consuls
3rd-century BC Roman consuls
Flamma, Lucius
340s BC births
270s BC deaths